M. flavescens may refer to:

 Macrothemis flavescens, a carnivorous insect
 Magellania flavescens, a marine animal
 Malouetia flavescens, a flowering plant
 Maro flavescens, a sheet weaver
 Marsdenia flavescens, an eastern Australian vine
 Melese flavescens, an Argentinian moth
 Memecylon flavescens, a plant endemic to India
 Mesolestes flavescens, a ground beetle
 Mesoprion flavescens, a subtropical fish
 Metareva flavescens, an Argentinian moth
 Microbacterium flavescens, a Gram-positive bacterium
 Miltonia flavescens, a South American orchid
 Mitra flavescens, a sea snail
 Monema flavescens, an Asian moth
 Monocerotesa flavescens, a geometer moth
 Mycena flavescens, a fungus with an edible mushroom
 Mycobacterium flavescens, a Gram-positive bacterium
 Mytilaspis flavescens, a scale insect